Kobayashi mikan (Citrus natsudaidai × unshiu) is a Citrus hybrid cultivated for its edible fruit.

Genetics
Kobayashi mikan is a graft hybrid between an amanatsu (Citrus natsudaidai) and a satsuma mandarin (Citrus unshiu).

Distribution
It is cultivated and occurs naturally in Japan and is also grown in California.

Description
The fruit is small to medium in size and oblate to round in shape. The rind is mostly smooth but is normally slightly rough and is medium to bright orange in color. The flesh is dark orange and moderately seedy. The flavor is said to be tart. The tree is densely branched and has a broad crown, and the leaves are elliptical in shape. It has been cultivated for over 70 years.

Availability
It is no longer commercially available in the United States.

See also
Kinkoji unshiu
Japanese citrus
List of citrus fruits

References

Citrus
Citrus hybrids
Fruit trees
Edible fruits
Japanese fruit
Fruits originating in East Asia
Oranges (fruit)